The Essential may refer to:
 The Essential Series, an Irish radio show
 The Essential (Concrete Blonde album), 2005
 The Essential (Divinyls album), 2008
 The Essential (Don Johnson album), 1997
 The Essential (Era album), 2010
 The Essential (Ganggajang album), 1996
 The Essential (Grandmaster Flash and the Furious Five album), 2010
 The Essential (Nik Kershaw album), 2000
 The Essential, a collection of compilation albums published by EMI Records. Examples include:
 The Essential (Sandra album), a re-release of 18 Greatest Hits
 The Essential Diesel, a 2009 best of album by Diesel
 The Essential, a collection of compilation albums published by Sony's Legacy Recordings label. Examples include:
 The Essential 1927, 2013
 The Essential (Alabama album), a 2005 re-release of For the Record
 The Essential Alice in Chains, 2006
 The Essential Alison Moyet, 2001
 The Essential Billy Joel by Billy Joel, 2011
 The Essential Cyndi Lauper, 2003
 The Essential Daryl Braithwaite, 2007
 The Essential Foo Fighters, 2022
 The Essential (John Farnham album), 2009
 The Essential  (Korn album), 2011
 The Essential (Marcia Hines album), 2007
 The Essential (Toto album), 2003
 The Essential Michael Jackson, 2005
 The Essential John Denver, 2007
 The Essential, a 2011 re-release of Celine Dion's My Love: Essential Collection

See also 
 The Essentials (disambiguation)
 Essential (disambiguation)